Story of a Heart may refer to:
Story of a Heart (album)
"Story of a Heart" (song)